Kwan Yin Chan Lin Zen Meditation Centre (KYCL) is a Buddhist zen centre in Singapore and Malaysia. The organization was set up by Venerable Chi Boon (釋繼聞法師) in 1991. The present KYCL centres are located at Geylang, Singapore, KYCL International Zen Centre at Pengerang, Desaru and Fu Hui Yuan at Muar (inaugurated in 2018) in Johor, Malaysia.

Overview
Kwan Yin Chan Lin Zen Meditation Centre was founded in 1991 by Venerable Chi Boon with Venerable Chuk Mor (竺摩長老), Seung Sahn Dae Soen Sa Nim (崇山大禪師) and Harada Tangen Roshi (原田湛玄禪師) being the spiritual teacher. Venerable Chi Boon received the ‘inka’ as Zen Guiding Teacher or Ji Do Bop Sa (指導法師）on 8 November 1998 from Seung Sahn, as an acknowledgment of accomplishment in Zen practice and authorization in teaching Kwan Um School of Zen's teaching style.. KYCL is the only Korean Buddhism Kong-an Zen practice (公案禪) monastery or centre in Singapore.

Events
Regular events at the centre include:
 Kong-an Zen Group Practice
 Sutra Chanting and Repentance Ceremony
 Dharma Talks and Sharing
 Traditional Chinese Medical Free Clinic Service
 Youth Club
 Children Classes.

See also
Buddhism in Singapore
Kwan Um School of Zen
Korean Buddhism

References

External links

Buddhist organisations based in Singapore
Buddhist temples in Singapore
Geylang